Varsi is a surname. Notable people with the surname include:

Aloysius Varsi (1830–1900), American educator and college president
Diane Varsi (1938–1992), American actress
Dinorah Varsi, Uruguayan classical pianist
Turid Dørumsgaard Varsi (born 1938), Norwegian politician